Equality Connecticut is a statewide political advocacy organization in Connecticut that advocates for lesbian, gay, bisexual, transgender, and queer (LGBTQ) rights.

History 
Equality Connecticut was formed in 2023, in order to create a statewide lobbying network on behalf of Connecticut's LGBTQ community.

Structure 
Equality Connecticut is a member of Social and Environmental Entrepreneurs, 501(c)(3) nonprofit organization working on charitable, scientific, and educational efforts to promote human rights.

Activities 
Equality Connecticut engages in political lobbying on LGBT issues, with the stated goal of advancing the rights, health, history, and culture of the LGBTQIA+ community. Long-term priorities of the organization include the expansion of state suicide prevention programs to be more LGBTQ inclusive, the support of legislation to ensure the coverage of fertility care for LGBTQ people, the support of the state's LGBTQ Health and Human Services Committee Advocate and fundraising for the creation of a Connecticut AIDS memorial in Hartford.

See also 

 LGBT rights in Connecticut
 List of LGBT rights organizations
 Same-sex marriage in Connecticut

References

External links 
 official website

2023 establishments in Connecticut
Equality Federation
LGBT in Connecticut
LGBT political advocacy groups in Connecticut
Organizations based in Hartford, Connecticut
Organizations established in 2023